Sande is a former municipality in Vestfold County, Norway.  Its administrative centre is the village of Sande i Vestfold. The municipality of Sande was established on 1 January 1838 (see formannskapsdistrikt).

In recent years the administrative center of Sande has grown significantly due to many new apartments and stores.

Portions of the 1973 Olsenbanden movie Olsenbanden tar gull from were filmed in Sande. Another portion was filmed Stavern.

General information

Name
The municipality (originally the parish) is named after the old Sande farm (Old Norse: Sandvin) because the first church was built there. The first element in the name, sandr, means "sand", and the last element, vin, means "meadow" or "pasture".

Coat-of-arms
The coat-of-arms is from modern times. It was granted on 19 December 1986, and it represents silver-colored Sandebukta bay, with its typical  shape, surrounded by forests and mountains.

Geography
Presteseteråsen (568 m.) is located in westernmost Sande municipality and is the highest point in Sande.

Media
The newspaper Sande Avis is published in Sande.

Sande Church
Sande in Vestfold is the site of the medieval era Sande Church (Sande kirke, Vestfold). It is located in Sande parish in Nord-Jarlsberg rural deanery. The building material is stone and brick, and it was built in 1150. In 1783, the church burned down; only the walls remained. Over the next eight years, it was rebuilt, and 1860 the church was refurnished. But the older altarpiece, baptismal font, and pulpit were retained. The pulpit is also from 1783 and features Rococo-style carvings. The font of soapstone is the only medieval inventory preserved.

Sister cities
The following cities are twinned with Sande:
  Akaa, Western Finland, Finland
  Klippan, Skåne County, Sweden

Famous inhabitants
 Carl I. Hagen, former Vice President of the Norwegian Parliament and chairman of the Progress Party from 1978 until 2006.
 Rune Høydahl, former silver medalist in the World Mountain Bike Championship
 Anne-Sofie Østvedt (1920-2009), Norvegian Resistance Member

References

External links

Municipal fact sheet from Statistics Norway

 
Municipalities of Vestfold og Telemark
Villages in Vestfold og Telemark